SkyLine is a free automatic people mover system at Frankfurt Airport which opened 1994. Using Bombardier CX-100 coaches, the line links the two airport terminals within 8 minutes.

The line has a headway from 90 seconds. The 60 million annual passengers of the airport and its 75,000 employees generate an annual traffic of 10 million journeys on Skyline.

Stations

 Terminal 1, Concourse A, Z
 Terminal 1, Concourse B (interchange long-distance- and regional station)
 Terminal 1, Concourse C (only for Passengers)
 Terminal 2, Concourse D, E

Airport people mover systems
VAL people movers
People mover systems in Germany
Transport in Frankfurt